Millston is an unincorporated census-designated place located in the town of Millston, Jackson County, Wisconsin, United States. As of the 2010 census, its population is 125. Millston is surrounded by the Black River State Forest.

History
Millston was founded in 1870 by H. B. Mills, and named for him. A post office called Millston has been in operation since 1874.

Images

References

Census-designated places in Jackson County, Wisconsin
Census-designated places in Wisconsin